Mitochondrion is a Canadian black-death metal band from Victoria, British Columbia, formed in 2003. The band has undergone some line-up changes, but since 2006 Mitochondrion was solidified as a power trio with Shawn Haché (guitar, vocals), Nick Yanchuk (guitar, vocals, bass) and Karl Godard (drums, keyboards). With this line-up Mitochondrion has recorded two full-length studio albums, the self-released Archaeaeon (2008) and Parasignosis (2011), which was released through Profound Lore Records. They later released an EP "Antinumerology" released by Dark Descent Records and Krucyator Productions and a split EP "In Cronian Hour" released by Dark Descent Records and Hellthrasher Productions.

According to music critics, "What makes Mitochondrion stand out is their ability to bring order to chaos. [...] It is a trait they share with Deathspell Omega, who craft a dizzying amount of sounds and influences into something palpably evil and eminently listenable. When most other bands try this, it sounds like they are toying with forces they do not understand." The musicianship on Parasignosis has been defined by Decibel magazine as a "dense, not-so-easily-digestible labyrinth of frightening mindfuckery," while Parasignosis itself was praised as a "mind-blowing, highly individual album."

Members
Current
Shawn Haché - vocals, guitars (2003-present)
Nick Yanchuk - vocals, guitars, bass (2003-present)
Sebastian Montesi - bass, vocals (2012-present)
Karl Godard - drums, keyboards (2006-present)

Former
Mitch Aramenko - guitars (2003-2007)
Nick Gibas - bass, noise (2003-2009)
Jesse Anderson - drums (2003-2006)

Live
Rob Hamilton - bass (2011-2012)

Discography
Studio albums
Archaeaon (2008)
Parasignosis (2011)

EPs
Antinumerology (2013)

Demos
Mitohondrion (2005)
Through Cosmic Gaze (2006)

Splits
Rituals of Transcendence / Liimk Halaayt (2010; w/ Gyibaaw)
In Cronian Hour (2016; w/ Auroch)

References

Musical groups established in 2003
Canadian death metal musical groups
Canadian black metal musical groups
Musical groups from Victoria, British Columbia
2003 establishments in British Columbia